Jan Sandström may refer to:

 Jan Sandström (composer) (born 1954)
 Jan Sandström (ice hockey) (born 1978)